Akalgarh is a  village located in Ludhiana district of Punjab in India. This town is inhabited mainly by people having saran ,dhaliwal,gill and kaura as their surname.

References

Villages in Ludhiana district